Pomaderris elliptica, commonly known as yellow dogwood or smooth pomaderris, is a species of flowering plant in the family Rhamnaceae and is endemic to south-eastern Australia. It is a shrub with densely hairy branchlets, egg-shaped or elliptic leaves, and pale yellow flowerss.

Description
The upper surface of the leaves is glabrous and the lower surface densely covered with star-shaped hairs. Flowering occurs from September to December.

Taxonomy
Pomaderris elliptica was first formally described in 1805 by Jacques Labillardière in his Novae Hollandiae Plantarum Specimen. The specific epithet (elliptica) means "elliptic".

The names of two varieties are accepted by the Australian Plant Census:
Pomaderris elliptica var. diemenica N.G.Walsh & Coates;
Pomaderris elliptica Labill. var. elliptica.

Distribution and habitat
This pomaderris grows in open forest and is widespread from south of Taree in New South Wales through south-eastern Victoria to Tasmania. Variety diemenica is endemic to Tasmania.

References

elliptica
Flora of New South Wales
Flora of Victoria (Australia)
Flora of Tasmania
Taxa named by Jacques Labillardière